Kenda is a census town in Bardhaman district in the Indian state of West Bengal.

Kenda may also refer to:
 New Kenda, operational area of Eastern Coalfields Limited, in Paschim Bardhaman district, West Bengal, India
 Kenda, Purulia, a village, with a police station, in Purulia district, West Bengal, India
 Kenda Area, operational area of Eastern Coalfields Limited, in Paschim Bardhaman district, West Bengal, India
 Joe Kenda (born 1946), American police detective
 Kenda Perez (born 1983), Mexican-American model and host
 Kenda Rubber Industrial Company, a tire manufacturer in Taiwan.
 Kenya National Democratic Alliance, a political party in Kenya
 Macaranga peltata, a plant found in northern Thailand, Sri Lanka and India.